USA-42, also known as GPS II-3 and GPS SVN-16, was an American navigation satellite which formed part of the Global Positioning System. It was the third of nine Block II GPS satellites to be launched, which were the first operational GPS satellites to be placed into orbit.

Background 
It was part of the 21-satellite Global Positioning System (GPS) Block II series that provides precise position data (accurate to within 16 m) to military and civilian users worldwide. Its signals could be received on devices as small as a telephone. The GPS II satellites, built by Rockwell International for the Air Force Space Systems Division, each have a 7.5-year design life. The Air Force intends to launch a GPS II every 2 to 3 months until the constellation of 21 operational satellite and 3 spares is aloft. The GPS Block II join 7 operational Block 1 satellites.

Launch 
USA-42 was launched at 05:57:59 UTC on 18 August 1989, atop a Delta II launch vehicle, flight number D186, flying in the 6925 configuration. The launch took place from Launch Complex 17A (LC-17A) at the Cape Canaveral Air Force Station (CCAFS), and placed USA-42 into a transfer orbit. The satellite raised itself into medium Earth orbit using a Star-37XFP apogee motor.

Mission 
It had a design life of 7.5 years, and ceased operations on 13 October 2000.

References 

GPS satellites
USA satellites
Spacecraft launched in 1989